Tokio (minor planet designation: 498 Tokio) (1902 KU) is a main-belt asteroid discovered on 2 December 1902 by Auguste Charlois at the Nice Observatory.
Attribution to Astronomer Shin Hirayama of the Azabu  Observatory, Tokyo, Japan for the 1900 discovery and naming of Tokio as cited in the 1947 Monthly Newsletter of the Royal Astronomical Society Vol 107, page 45.

References

Attribution to Astronomer Shin Hirayama of the Azabu  Observatory, Tokyo, Japan for the 1900 discovery and naming of Tokio as cited in the 1947 Monthly Newsletter of the Royal Astronomical Society Vol 107, page 45.
http://articles.adsabs.harvard.edu/full/seri/MNRAS/0107//0000045.000.html

External links
 
 

Background asteroids
Tokio
Tokio
Tokio
M-type asteroids (Tholen)
19021202